Sarah M. Pike is an American author and professor of comparative religion in the Department of Religious studies at California State University, Chico. Her interests include paganism, environmentalism, religion and ecology, and ritual studies. Her research on neopaganism and radical environmentalism has been lauded as being significant to the study of festival and group behaviour. She is the president of the International Society for the Study of Religion, Nature, and Culture, co-chair of the American Academy of Religion, Ritual Studies Group, and director of the California State University, Chico Humanities Center.

Education 
Pike completed her BA, cum laude, in Religion at Duke University in 1983. She earned her MA and PhD (with distinction) in Religious studies from Indiana University in 1989 and 1998 respectively. Her doctoral advisor was Robert Orsi. During her time at Indiana University, Pike extensively observed and involved herself within local (Midwestern) neopagan communities and gatherings as part of her field research.

Publications

Books 
Pike's most recent book titled For the Wild: Ritual and Commitment in Radical Eco-Activism covers issues regarding the demonization of radical environmentalists and how religious studies translate into nature and ecology. She explores the motivations for those who partake in risky and illegal behaviour to protest against the destruction of natural habitats and forestry. Her first book, Earthly Bodies, Magical Selves, primarily focuses on neopagan festival behaviours including witchcraft, magic, Spiritualist gatherings, as well as individual and group identity. In her book, New Age and Neopagan Religions in America, Pike sees members of neopagan religions as placing high emphasis on ritual practice as a way of shaping individual and group identities, having significant connections with nature, and understanding God as a living entity.

 Pike, Sarah M. (2017) For the Wild: Ritual and Commitment in Radical Eco-Activism, Berkeley and Los Angeles: University of California Press. 
Pike, Sarah M. (2004) New Age and Neopagan Religions in America, New York: Columbia University Press. 
Pike, Sarah M. (2001) Earthly Bodies, Magical Selves: Contemporary Pagans and the Search for Community, Berkeley and Los Angeles: University of California Press.

Selected articles and book chapters
Pike has written several articles and book chapters on topics such as Burning Man, neopaganism, rituals, environmentalism, youth spirituality, New religious movement and animal rights activism. Her work also includes Wiccan ritual practices pertaining to sexuality, polyamory, and marriage.

Awards and recognition

Selected positions 

board of directors, American Academy of Religion
board of directors, International Society for the Study of Religion, Nature, and Culture
 Chair, American Academy of Religion's Committee for the Public Understanding of Religion
Chair, Department of Comparative Religion and Humanities, California State University, Chico

Awards

See also 

Burning Man
Drawing Down the Moon (book)
Neopaganism in the United States
Radical environmentalism
Religion and environmentalism
Spiritual ecology
Starwood Festival
Wiccan morality
Wiccan views of divinity

References

Living people
American religion academics
California State University, Chico faculty
Year of birth missing (living people)
Pagan studies scholars